The Turkish National Time Trial Championship is a cycling race organized by the Turkish Cycling Federation.

Multiple winners
Since 2008

Men

Women

Women Junior

Men
Source

Junior

Women
Source

Junior

See also
Turkish National Road Race Championships
National Road Cycling Championships

References

National road cycling championships
Cycle races in Turkey
Cycling